This article serves as an index – as complete as possible – of all the honorific orders or similar decorations awarded by Negeri Sembilan, classified by Monarchies chapter and Republics chapter, and, under each chapter, recipients' countries and the detailed list of recipients.

Awards

Monarchies

Negeri Sembilan Royal Family 
They have been awarded:

 Family of Munawir of Negeri Sembilan
 Muhriz of Negeri Sembilan
  Royal Family Order of Negeri Sembilan Grand Master (since 29 December 2008) and Member (25.2.2009)
  Grand Master of the Order of Negeri Sembilan (since 29 December 2008)
  Grand Master and Recipient of the Royal Family Order of Yam Tuan Radin Sunnah (since 29 December 2008)
  Grand Master of the Order of Loyalty to Negeri Sembilan (since 29 December 2008)
  Founding Grand Master of the Order of Loyalty to Tuanku Muhriz (Negeri Sembilan) (since 14 January 2010)
  Founding Grand Master of the Order of Loyal Service to Negeri Sembilan (since 14 January 2010)
  Grand Master of the Grand Order of Tuanku Ja’afar (Negeri Sembilan) (since 29 December 2008 )
  Founding Grand Master of the Distinguished Conduct Order (Negeri Sembilan) (since ?)
  Recipient of the Distinguished Conduct Medal (PPT)
 Tuanku Aishah Rohani, Yang di-Pertuan Besar's wife
  Member of the Royal Family Order of Negeri Sembilan (DKNS, 21.04.2009)
  Knight Commander or Dato’ Paduka of the Grand Order of Tuanku Ja’afar (DPTJ)
  Recipient of the Distinguished Conduct Medal (PPT) 
 Tunku Ali Redhauddin Muhriz, Yang di-Pertuan Besar's eldest son
  Recipient of the Royal Family Order of Yam Tuan Radin Sunnah (DKYR, 20.10.2009) 
 Tunku Zain al-’Abidin, Yang di-Pertuan Besar's second son
  Recipient of the Royal Family Order of Yam Tuan Radin Sunnah (DKYR, 20.10.2009)
 Tunku Umpa Munawirah, Tunku Putri, Yang di-Pertuan Besar's eldest younger sister
  Recipient of the Royal Family Order of Yam Tuan Radin Sunnah (DKYR, 19.7.1986)
 Tunku Datin Anne Dakhlah, Yang di-Pertuan Besar's third sister
  Recipient of the Royal Family Order of Yam Tuan Radin Sunnah (DKYR, 14.1.2010)
 Dato’ ‘Abdu’l Malik bin Tan Sri Shaikh ‘Abdu’llah, her husband
  Knight Companion of the Order of Loyalty to Negeri Sembilan (DSNS), now Knight Commander (or Dato’ Paduka, DPNS)
 Tunku Deborah, Yang di-Pertuan Besar's fourth sister
  Recipient of the Royal Family Order of Yam Tuan Radin Sunnah (DKYR, 14.1.2010)
 Y.Bhg. Dato’ Ahmad Fuad bin ‘Abdu’l Rahman, her husband
  Knight of the Order of Loyalty to Tuanku Muhriz (DSTM, 14.1.2011)
 Tunku Deannah, Yang di-Pertuan Besar's fifth sister
  Recipient of the Royal Family Order of Yam Tuan Radin Sunnah (DKYR, 14.1.2010)

 Family of Jaafar of Negeri Sembilan

 H.R.H. Tuanku Najihah, widow of late  Yang di-Pertuan Besar Jaafar of Negeri Sembilan :
  Member of the Royal Family Order of Negeri Sembilan (DKNS) 
  Knight Grand Commander or Dato’ Sri Paduka of the Grand Order of Tuanku Ja’afar (SPTJ)
 Tunku Naquiah, Tunku Dara, elder daughter and child of late  Yang di-Pertuan Besar Jaafar of Negeri Sembilan :
  Recipient of the Royal Family Order of Yam Tuan Radin Sunnah (DKYR, 16.8.1980)
  Knight Grand Commander or Dato’ Sri Paduka of the Grand Order of Tuanku Ja’afar (SPTJ)
  The Meritorious Service Medal (Pingat Jasa Kebaktian, PJK)
 Tunku Naquiyuddin, Tunku Laksamana, elder son and second child of late  Yang di-Pertuan Besar Jaafar of Negeri Sembilan :
  Member of the Royal Family Order of Negeri Sembilan (DKNS)
  Recipient of the Royal Family Order of Yam Tuan Radin Sunnah (DKYR)
   Knight Grand Commander or Dato’ Sri Paduka  Order of Loyalty to Negeri Sembilan (SPNS), now Principal Grand Knight (or Dato’ Sri Utama, SUNS)
  Knight Grand Commander or Dato’ Sri Paduka of the Grand Order of Tuanku Ja’afar (SPTJ)
  The Distinguished Conduct Medal (Pingat Pekerti Terpilih, PPT)
  The Meritorious Service Medal (Pingat Jasa Kebaktian, PJK)
 Tunku Imran, Tunku Muda of Serting, second son and third child of late  Yang di-Pertuan Besar Jaafar of Negeri Sembilan : 
  Paramount of the Order of Negeri Sembilan (DTNS, 19.7.1999)
  Recipient of the Royal Family Order of Yam Tuan Radin Sunnah (DKYR)
   Knight Grand Commander or Dato’ Sri Paduka  Order of Loyalty to Negeri Sembilan (SPNS), now Principal Grand Knight (or Dato’ Sri Utama, SUNS)
  The Meritorious Service Medal (Pingat Jasa Kebaktian, PJK)
 Tunku Jawahir, Tunku Putri, second daughter and fourth child of late  Yang di-Pertuan Besar Jaafar of Negeri Sembilan : 
  Recipient of the Royal Family Order of Yam Tuan Radin Sunnah (DKYR)
  Knight Grand Commander or Dato’ Sri Paduka of the Grand Order of Tuanku Ja’afar (SPTJ, 1997).
 Tunku Irinah, Tunku Putri, third daughter and fifth child of late  Yang di-Pertuan Besar Jaafar of Negeri Sembilan : 
  Recipient of the Royal Family Order of Yam Tuan Radin Sunnah (DKYR)
  Knight Grand Commander or Dato’ Sri Paduka of the Grand Order of Tuanku Ja’afar (SPTJ, 19.7.1999)
 Tunku Nazaruddin, Tunku Putra, third son and sixth child of late  Yang di-Pertuan Besar Jaafar of Negeri Sembilan : 
  Recipient of the Royal Family Order of Yam Tuan Radin Sunnah (DKYR)
  Knight Grand Commander or Dato’ Sri Paduka of the Grand Order of Tuanku Ja’afar (SPTJ, 22.7.2000)
 Tunku Mimi Wahida binti Tunku ‘Abdu’llah Wahman, his wife :
  Knight Grand Commander or Dato’ Sri Paduka of the Grand Order of Tuanku Ja’afar (SPTJ, 19.7.2003)
States of Malaysia

Johor Royal Family 
They have been awarded :

 Sultan Ibrahim Ismail of Johor :
  Member of the Royal Family Order of Negeri Sembilan (DKNS, 14/02/2011)

Kedah Royal Family 
They have been awarded:
 Princess Intan Safinaz, Sultan Abdul Halim of Kedah's daughter 
  Recipient of the Royal Family Order of Yam Tuan Radin Sunnah (DKYR, 19.7.2005)

Kelantan Royal Family 
They have been awarded:

 Muhammad V of Kelantan, Sultan of Kelantan (since 13 September 2010) :
  Member of the Royal Family Order of Negeri Sembilan (DKNS, 13.1.2011)
 Ismail Petra of Kelantan, Sultan Muhammad V of Kelantan's father and retired Sultan for illness :
  Member of the Royal Family Order of Negeri Sembilan (DKNS)
 Raja Perampuan Anis, Sultan Muhammad V of Kelantan's mother :
  Member of the Royal Family Order of Negeri Sembilan (DKNS)

Pahang Royal Family 
They have been awarded :

 Ahmad Shah of Pahang : 
  Member of the Royal Family Order of Negeri Sembilan (DKNS)
 Tengku Azlan, younger brother of the sultan.
  Knight Grand Commander of the Grand Order of Tuanku Ja’afar (SPTJ, 1995)
 Tunku Jawahir, Tunku Putri, Azlan's wife and Sultan Jaafar of Negeri Sembilan's daughter
   Recipient of the Royal Family Order of Yam Tuan Radin Sunnah (DKYR)
  Knight Grand Commander of the Grand Order of Tuanku Ja’afar (SPTJ, 1997)
 Tengku Asra Jehan Juzaila, their daughter
  Knight Commander of the Grand Order of Tuanku Ja’afar (DPTJ, 2.11.2004)

Perlis Royal Family 
They have been awarded :

 Sultan Sirajuddin of Perlis: 
  Member of the Royal Family Order of Negeri Sembilan (DKNS, 19.7.2001)

Selangor Royal Family 
They have been awarded :

 Sharafuddin of Selangor :
  Member of the Royal Family Order of Negeri Sembilan (DKNS, 19.7.2002)
 Tengku Ahmad Shah, third younger brother of Sultan Sharafuddin
  Knight Grand Commande of the Grand Order of Tuanku Ja’afar (SPTJ)

Terengganu Royal Family 

 Sultan Mizan Zainal Abidin of Terengganu (Sultan : since 15 May 1998 - Y.d-P.A. 12/2006-12/2011):
  Member of the Royal Family Order of Negeri Sembilan (DKNS, 19.7.2001)

to be completed

 Asian monarchies

Brunei Royal Family 
See also List of Malaysian Honours awarded to Heads of State and Royals

 Hassanal Bolkiah :
  Member of the Royal Family Order of Negeri Sembilan (DKNS, 6.8.1980)

to be completed

European monarchies

to be completed

Republics 

to be completed

See also 
 Mirror page : List of honours of the Negeri Sembilan Royal Family by country

References 

 
Negeri Sembilan